Clay is a ghost town in the town of Komensky, Jackson County, Wisconsin, United States. The community is still marked on Wisconsin Department of Transportation maps.

Notes

Geography of Jackson County, Wisconsin
Ghost towns in Wisconsin